Gloria Saccani Jotti is an Italian politician and professor of clinical pathology. She was elected to be a deputy to the Parliament of Italy in the 2018 Italian general election for the Legislature XVIII of Italy.

Career
Jotti was born on October 24, 1956 in Reggio Emilia. She is an anatomical pathologist, and worked as a professor of clinical pathology at the University of Parma.

She was elected to the Italian Parliament in the 2018 Italian general election, to represent the district of Lombardy 1 for Forza Italia.

References

Living people
Forza Italia politicians
Forza Italia (2013) politicians
1956 births
Deputies of Legislature XVIII of Italy
People from Reggio Emilia
21st-century Italian women politicians
Women members of the Chamber of Deputies (Italy)